State Road 32 (NM 32) is a  state highway in Catron County in the U.S. state of New Mexico. It stretches from NM 12 in Apache Creek northward to U.S. Route 60 (US 60) in Quemado.

Route description
Much of NM 32 runs through the Apache-Sitgreaves National Forest. Its southern terminus is at an intersection with NM 12 in the community of Apache Creek. From there, the road heads north, winding through the Gallo Mountains, before reaching its northern terminus in the town of Quemado at an intersection with US 60.

History
When the state highways were first posted in the early 20th century, NM 32 was originally much longer, extending as far north as Shiprock. When the U.S. Highway System was established in 1926, much of this route was taken over by U.S. Route 666 (now U.S. Route 491). What is now NM 32 is a remnant of the former route that was not renumbered as a U.S. Highway.

Major intersections

See also

References

External links

032
Transportation in Catron County, New Mexico